Betzdorf-Gebhardshain is a Verbandsgemeinde ("collective municipality") in the district of Altenkirchen, in Rhineland-Palatinate, Germany. The seat of the Verbandsgemeinde is in Betzdorf. It was formed on 1 January 2017 by the merger of the former Verbandsgemeinden Betzdorf and Gebhardshain.

The Verbandsgemeinde Betzdorf-Gebhardshain consists of the following Ortsgemeinden ("local municipalities"):

* seat of the Verbandsgemeinde

References

Verbandsgemeinde in Rhineland-Palatinate